Valentin Retailleau (born 18 June 2000) is a French cyclist, who currently rides for UCI WorldTeam .

Major results

2017
 2nd Grand Prix Bob Jungels
 9th Overall Aubel–Thimister–La Gleize
 9th Overall Sint-Martinusprijs Kontich
2018
 1st Overall Tour de Gironde
1st Stage 2
 1st Stage 3 Ronde des Vallées
 1st Stage 2a (TTT) Aubel–Thimister–Stavelot
 2nd Overall Driedaagse van Axel
 5th Overall Grand Prix Rüebliland
1st Mountains classification
1st Stage 4
 6th Overall Tour des Portes du Pays d'Othe
1st Stage 2 (TTT)
2021
 1st  Road race, National Under-23 Road Championships
 3rd Overall Tour de Bretagne
1st  Young rider classification
1st Stage 1
 7th Trofeo Città di San Vendemiano
2022
 1st Stage 4 Alpes Isère Tour
 3rd  Road race, Mediterranean Games
 3rd Overall Tour du Loir-et-Cher
1st  Young rider classification
 3rd Kattekoers

References

External links

2000 births
Living people
French male cyclists
Sportspeople from Limoges
Cyclists from Nouvelle-Aquitaine
Mediterranean Games bronze medalists for France
Competitors at the 2022 Mediterranean Games
21st-century French people